The Jeanne Mance Monument is a memorial in Montreal.

Overview  

The monument by Louis-Philippe Hébert portrays Jeanne Mance comforting an injured colonist. 

The monument to Jeanne Mance was unveiled on September 2, 1909, in front of the Hôtel-Dieu de Montréal. In 1909 was celebrated the 250th anniversary of the arrival of the first three hospital sisters (1659). In 1642, she came specifically to establish Montreal's first hospital, Hôtel-Dieu de Montréal. The hospital operated at different location during the New France and moved to present location in 1861.

Gallery

Notes 
 
 Alan Gordon, Making Public Pasts: The Contested Terrain of Montreal's Public Memories, 1891–1930. McGill-Queen's University Press, 2001, p.135. 

1909 in Canada
1909 sculptures
Bronze sculptures in Canada
Granite sculptures in Canada
History of Montreal 
Monuments and memorials in Montreal
Outdoor sculptures in Montreal
Sculptures of men in Canada
Sculptures of women in Canada
Statues in Canada
Cultural depictions of Canadian women
Cultural depictions of nurses
Sculptures by Louis-Philippe Hébert